Sepia is a genus of cuttlefish in the family Sepiidae encompassing some of the best known and most common species.  The cuttlebone is relatively ellipsoid in shape. The name of the genus is the Latinized form of the Ancient Greek , sēpía, cuttlefish.

Anatomy
All members of Sepia share certain characteristics.  Among them are the presence of eight arms and two tentacles.  Tentacles are retractable limbs used specifically to latch on to prey; the arms are used for holding and manipulating that prey, as well as for producing patterns of light and dark meant to distract that prey, but the tentacles serve no purpose other than to target and adhere to potential prey items. Once a prey item has been caught, the tentacles detach from it and have no other function.All members Sepia have two such tentacles in addition to their eight regular arms.  The tentacles reside in sheaths that run below the eyes and behind the head, into the visceral mass.  Here they are reserved as coiled, spring-loaded appendages, waiting to be sprung.

Classification

Genus Sepia
Subgenus undetermined
? Sepia bartletti
? Sepia baxteri *
? Sepia dannevigi *
? Sepia elliptica, ovalbone cuttlefish
Sepia filibrachia
Sepia mira
Sepia plana
Sepia senta
Sepia subplana
? Sepia whitleyana, Whitley's cuttlefish
Subgenus Acanthosepion
Sepia aculeata, needle cuttlefish
Sepia brevimana, shortclub cutttlefish
Sepia esculenta, golden cuttlefish
Sepia lycidas, kisslip cuttlefish
Sepia prashadi, hooded cuttlefish 
Sepia orbignyana, pink cuttlefish
Sepia recurvirostra, curvespine cuttlefish
Sepia savignyi, broadback cuttlefish 
Sepia smithi, Smith's cuttlefish 
Sepia stellifera
Sepia thurstoni
Sepia vecchioni 
Sepia zanzibarica
Subgenus Anomalosepia
Sepia australis, southern cuttlefish 
Sepia omani, Oman cuttlefish
Sepia sulcata, grooved cuttlefish
Subgenus Doratosepion
Sepia adami
Sepia andreana, Andrea cuttlefish
Sepia appelloefi
Sepia arabica, Arabian cuttlefish
Sepia aureomaculata
Sepia bathyalis
Sepia bidhaia
Sepia braggi, slender cuttlefish
Sepia burnupi
Sepia carinata
Sepia confusa
Sepia cottoni
Sepia elongata
Sepia erostrata
Sepia foliopeza
Sepia incerta
Sepia ivanovi
Sepia joubini
Sepia kiensis *
Sepia kobiensis, Kobi cuttlefish 
Sepia koilados
Sepia limata
Sepia longipes, longarm cuttlefish
Sepia lorigera, spider cuttlefish
Sepia mascarensis
Sepia mirabilis
Sepia murrayi, frog cuttlefish
Sepia pardex
Sepia peterseni
Sepia rhoda
Sepia saya
Sepia sewelli
Sepia sokotriensis
Sepia subtenuipes
Sepia tala
Sepia tanybracheia
Sepia tenuipes
Sepia tokioensis
Sepia trygonina, trident cuttlefish
Sepia vercoi
Sepia vietnamica
Subgenus Hemisepius
Sepia dubia
Sepia faurei
Sepia pulchra
Sepia robsoni
Sepia typica
Subgenus Rhombosepion
Sepia acuminata
Sepia cultrata, knifebone cuttlefish
Sepia elegans, elegant cuttlefish
Sepia hedleyi, Hedley's cuttlefish
Sepia hieronis
Sepia madokai, Madokai's cuttlefish
? Sepia opipara
Sepia reesi
Sepia rex
Sepia vossi
Subgenus Sepia
Sepia angulata *
Sepia apama, Australian giant cuttlefish 
Sepia bandensis, stumpy-spined cuttlefish
Sepia bertheloti, African cuttlefish
Sepia chirotrema
Sepia dollfusi
Sepia elobyana, Guinean cuttlefish
Sepia gibba
Sepia hierredda, giant African cuttlefish
Sepia insignis
Sepia irvingi
Sepia latimanus, broadclub cuttlefish
Sepia mestus, reaper cuttlefish
Sepia novaehollandiae, New Holland cuttlefish
Sepia officinalis, common cuttlefish
Sepia papillata
Sepia papuensis, Papuan cuttlefish
Sepia pharaonis, pharaoh cuttlefish 
Sepia plangon, mourning cuttlefish
Sepia plathyconchalis
Sepia ramani
Sepia rozella, rosecone cuttlefish
Sepia simoniana
Sepia tuberculata
Sepia vermiculata

The species listed above with an asterisk (*) are questionable and need further study to determine if they are a valid species or a synonym. The question mark (?) indicates questionable placement within the genus.

Extinct species

A number of extinct species have been described from the Neogene of Europe, though many of these are likely synonyms. They include:

Sepia bertii Foresti, 1890
Sepia complanata Bellardi, 1872
Sepia craversii Gastaldi, 1868
Sepia gastaldii Bellardi, 1872
Sepia granosa Bellardi, 1872
Sepia harmati Szörenyi, 1933
Sepia hungarica Lörenthey, 1898
Sepia isseli Bellardi, 1872
Sepia michelotti Gastaldi, 1868
Sepia rugulosa Bellardi, 1872
Sepia stricta Bellardi, 1872
Sepia verrucosa Bellardi, 1872
Sepia vindobonensis Schloenbach, 1869

References

External links

Tree of Life web project: Sepia

Cuttlefish
Articles containing video clips
Cephalopod genera
Taxa named by Carl Linnaeus